Menard County is a county located on the Edwards Plateau in the U.S. state of Texas. As of the 2020 census, its population was 1,962. The county seat is Menard. The county was created in 1858 and later organized in 1871. It is named for Michel Branamour Menard, the founder of Galveston, Texas.

History

Around 8000, early Native American inhabitants arrived. Later Native Americans included Comanche and Lipan Apache. In 1757, Father Alonso Giraldo de Terreros founded Presidio San Luis de las Amarillas, as a support for Santa Cruz de San Sabá Mission, for the Apache Indians.
In the 1830s, James Bowie and Rezin P. Bowie, scoured the San Saba valley seeking a silver mine that the Spanish had believed to be in the area. They are unsuccessful, but the legend of the Lost Bowie Mine, also known as the Lost San Saba Mine or the Los Almagres Mine, fed the imagination of treasure-seekers for the next 150 years.

Camp San Saba was established in 1852  to protect settlers from Indian attacks.  The state legislature formed Menard County from Bexar County in 1858. The county was named for Michel Branamour Menard, the founder of Galveston. Menardville, later known as Menard, became the county seat.

By 1870, the county population was 667: 295 were white, and 372 were black, possibly due to the Buffalo Soldiers at Fort McKavett.
The next year, county residents elected their own officials. The county had an immigrant influx from Mexico.
In 1911, the Fort Worth and Rio Grande Railroad Company arrived.
Gas deposits were tapped in 1929, but plugged for lack of a market.
The local Parent-Teacher Association offered free lunches for needy children in 1931.

In 1934, the Texas Relief Cannery was in operation. The Drought Relief Program bought cattle and sheep from area ranchers. A gas well was redrilled in 1941, and produced about seven million cubic feet of gas. In 1946, a small oilfield was discovered northeast of Fort McKavett, but was abandoned the following year.
In the 1980s, of the county's 40 oilfields, about 20 were still active, producing 132,000 to  annually.

Geography

Major highways
  U.S. Highway 83
  U.S. Highway 190
  U.S. Highway 377
  State Highway 29

Adjacent counties
 Concho County (north)
 McCulloch County (northeast)
 Mason County (east)
 Kimble County (south)
 Schleicher County (west)
 Sutton County (southwest)
 Tom Green County (northwest)

Demographics

Note: the US Census treats Hispanic/Latino as an ethnic category. This table excludes Latinos from the racial categories and assigns them to a separate category. Hispanics/Latinos can be of any race.

As of the census of 2000, 2,360 people, 990 households, and 665 families resided in the county.  The population density was 3 people per square mile (1/km2).  The 1,607 housing units averaged 2 per square mile (1/km2).  The racial makeup of the county was 87.54% White, 0.51% African American, 0.64% Native American, 0.34% Asian, 0.04% Pacific Islander, 9.79% from other races, and 1.14% from two or more races. About 31.69% of the population was Hispanic or Latino of any race.

Of the 990 households, 28.50% had children under the age of 18 living with them, 54.00% were married couples living together, 8.80% had a female householder with no husband present, and 32.80% were not families. Around 30.40% of all households was made up of individuals, and 17.50% had someone living alone who was 65 years of age or older.  The average household size was 2.34 and the average family size was 2.91.

In the county, the population was distributed as 24.20% under the age of 18, 5.30% from 18 to 24, 21.90% from 25 to 44, 26.60% from 45 to 64, and 21.90% who were 65 years of age or older.  The median age was 44 years. For every 100 females, there were 99.70 males.  For every 100 females age 18 and over, there were 93.10 males.

Males had a median income of $21,953 versus $20,000 for females. The per capita income for the county was $15,987. About 20.00% of families and 25.80% of the population were below the poverty line, including 39.90% of those under age 18 and 19.10% of those age 65 or over.

Communities

Census-designated place
 Menard (county seat)

Unincorporated communities
 Callan
 Erna
 Hext
 Saline

Ghost towns
 Fort McKavett
 Sunnyside

Politics

In popular culture
The 1968 movie Journey to Shiloh features a group known as the "Concho County Comanches," and mentions Menard County.

See also

 List of museums in Central Texas
 National Register of Historic Places listings in Menard County, Texas
 Recorded Texas Historic Landmarks in Menard County

References

External links
 Library of Congress Historic American Buildings Survey (Menard Co)  
 
 Texas Beyond History, Mission San Saba

 
1858 establishments in Texas
Texas Hill Country